Dark Days is the debut studio album by American rock band Loaded. Recorded between December 2000 and February 2001 at Jupiter Studios in Seattle, Washington, it was self-released in July 2001.

History
In 2000, Duff began re-recording some of the songs from Beautiful Disease ("Seattlehead", "Then and Now" and "Superman"), as well as new material at Jupiter Studios in Seattle, Washington. For recording, he brought in drummer Geoff Reading formerly of Green Apple Quick Step and New American Shame, guitarist Dave Dederer formerly of The Presidents of the United States of America and producer Martin Feveyear who also performed keyboards on the album. Duff performed the bass on all tracks as well as guitar and the piano on the song "Misery". Former Nevada Bachelors and Harvey Danger guitarist Mike Squires was also invited to record additional guitar parts on the album. In June, 2001, Duff announced that the album would be titled Dark Days and that it would be released under the moniker Loaded rather than using his own name for the project.

Release and promotion
Dark Days was released in the US and Japan in July, 2001. It was later released in Europe in July, 2002.

Loaded announced three dates at the House of Blues taking place in Anaheim, California, Las Vegas, Nevada and West Hollywood, California in November 2001. To perform at these shows, Mike Squires was added as the group's lead guitarist and when Duff took up the second guitar position, Alien Crime Syndicate bassist Jeff Rouse joined the group. Additional US dates were announced for 2002 as well as a tour in Japan. European tour followed in summer of 2002.

The album was reissued in February 2008 by Pimp Records on both CD and digital download formats, with a limited edition version with the bonus live tracks from the band's 2002 tour of Japan available exclusively at CDBaby.

Track listing

Personnel

Duff McKagan – lead vocals, bass guitar, guitar, piano on "Misery", production
Dave Dederer – guitar, production
Geoff Reading – drums, backing vocals, percussion, production
Martin Feveyear – keyboards, backing vocals, production

Additional personnel
Mike Squires – additional guitars
Jon Irvie – engineering
Mike Easton – engineering
Dave Colins – mastering

See also
Beautiful Disease

References

2001 debut albums
Albums produced by Martin Feveyear
Loaded (band) albums